Gareth Gill (birth unknown), also known by the nickname of "Gilly", is an Irish professional rugby league footballer who plays as a  for the Longhorns RL in the Irish Elite League.

Gill is an Irish international. In 2016 he was called up to the Ireland squad for the 2017 Rugby League World Cup European Pool B qualifiers.

References

Living people
Longhorns RL players
Irish rugby league players
Ireland national rugby league team players
Rugby league players from County Down
Rugby league props
Year of birth missing (living people)